Mal Mir (also Romanized as Māl Mīr) is a village in Liravi-ye Johnnie Rural District, Imam Hass an District, Deylam Count, Bushehr Province, Iran. At the 2006 census, its population was 61, in 17 families.

References 

Populated places in Deylam County